Contoderopsis aurivillii is a species of beetle in the family Cerambycidae. It was described by Breuning in 1956. It is endemic to the Philippines.

References

Acanthocinini
Beetles described in 1956
Endemic fauna of the Philippines
Taxa named by Stephan von Breuning (entomologist)